Agustín Ibarrola (born 1930) is a Spanish painter and sculptor.

He was born in Basauri, Biscay, Basque Autonomous Community, Spain.
In 1948, the Delegation of Biscay and the city council of Bilbao granted him a scholarship to study in Madrid, where he lived until 1955.

He has had various exhibitions in Spain and in 1955 was transferred to Paris. In 1957, he was a member of the group Equipment 57 with Duarte, Serrano, and others. This was in the time of constructivism.

Due to his communist militancy, he was imprisoned for several years in the prison of Burgos. In 1963, when an exhibition of his work in London was mounted, a critic compared his work with Goya's The Disasters of War.

In the 1980s he began sculpting; this inspired him to create the Oma Forest near Guernica, which is perhaps his best known work. The piece is currently being relocated to the nearby Basobarri Forest due to a fungal infection destroying the original painted trees.

His work combines the Basque spirit with the social commitment of the humblest workers, people who tend towards expressionism.

One of his last and most spectacular works was Cubes of Memory, in the port of Llanes.

In recent year he has been tied to the founder of the platform ¡Basta Ya!, a civic group fighting against terrorism in the Basque Country. Due to his bitter opposition to ETA, a group proscribed as terrorist by the Spanish state, Ibarrola has been threatened by ETA.

He has been awarded the Medal of the Order of the Constitutional Merit.

He is known for his Land Art. One of his most famous works is the Ibarrola's forest, where he painted many trees with a lot of colours creating a beautiful combination of nature and colours.

References

External links

1930 births
Living people
People from Basauri
Basque painters
20th-century Spanish painters
20th-century Spanish male artists
Spanish male painters
21st-century Spanish painters
Recipients of the Order of Constitutional Merit
21st-century Spanish male artists